Diphenylchloroarsine (DA) is the organoarsenic compound with the formula (C6H5)2AsCl. It is highly toxic and was once used in chemical warfare. It is also an intermediate in the preparation of other organoarsenic compounds. The molecule consists of a pyramidal As(III) center attached to two phenyl rings and one chloride. It was also known as sneezing oil during World War I by the Allies.

Preparation and structure
It was first produced in 1878 by the German chemists August Michaelis (1847–1916) and Wilhelm La Coste (1854–1885). It is prepared by the reduction of diphenylarsinic acid with sulfur dioxide. An idealized equation is shown:
Ph2AsO2H + SO2 + HCl → Ph2AsCl + H2SO4
The process adopted by Edgewood Arsenal for the production of DA for chemical warfare purposes employed a reaction between chlorobenzene and arsenic trichloride in the presence of sodium.

The structure consists of pyramidal As centre. The As-Cl distance is 2.26 A and the Cl-As-C and C-As-C angles are 96 and 105°, respectively.

Uses
It is a useful reagent for the preparation of other diphenylarsenic compounds, e.g. by reactions with Grignard reagents:
RMgBr + (C6H5)2AsCl → (C6H5)2AsR + MgBrCl
(R = alkyl, aryl)

Chemical warfare
Diphenylchlorarsine was used as a chemical weapon on the Western front during the trench warfare of World War I. It belongs to the class of chemicals classified as vomiting agents. Other such agents are diphenylcyanoarsine (DC) and diphenylaminechlorarsine (DM, Adamsite). Diphenylchlorarsine was sometimes believed to penetrate the gas masks of the time and to cause violent sneezing, forcing removal of the protecting device. The Germans called it  (mask breaker), together with other substances with similar effects, such as Adamsite, diphenylarsincyanide, and diphenylaminarsincyanide. This gas did not actually penetrate masks any better than other gases.

Safety
Diphenylchlorarsine is known to cause sneezing, coughing, headache, salivation, and vomiting. China and Japan are negotiating remediation of stocks of a variety of organoarsenic weapons, including chlorodiphenylarsine, dumped in northeastern China after Japan's numerous invasions of China.

See also
Blue Cross (chemical warfare)

References 

Chemical weapons
Organoarsenic chlorides
Vomiting agents
Phenyl compounds
Arsenic(III) compounds